The depressed river mussel or compressed river mussel, Pseudanodonta complanata, is a species of freshwater mussel, an aquatic bivalve mollusk in the family Unionidae, the river mussels. The species name comes from the flattened shape of its shell.

This species is found throughout northern Europe, but it is endangered throughout its range.

While the survival of this species is thought to be threatened by pollution and the dredging of the slow-moving channels of water in which it lives, the species is also said to be "easily overlooked" (it can be confused with Anodonta anatina or juvenile Anodonta cygnea) and thus it may be actually be more prevalent than current records show.

Distribution
Its native distribution is European. It has been recorded from:
 Czech Republic - in Bohemia, in Moravia, endangered (EN). It is endangered in Bohemia and critically endangered in Moravia.
 Estonia - present.
 Finland - not uncommon.
 Germany
 critically endangered (vom Aussterben bedroht)
 Listed as strictly protected species and as specially protected species in annex 1 in Bundesartenschutzverordnung.
 Netherlands - present
 Poland - endangered

 Slovakia - endangered
 United Kingdom - see Action plan for Pseudanodonta complanata, (British Isles - listed in List of endangered species in the British Isles)
 Sweden - rare

References

 Polish Red Data Book of Animals: Pseudanodonta complanata
 Action plan for Pseudanodonta complanata
 Nature Navigator: Detail of Depressed River Mussel

Unionidae
Freshwater animals of Europe
Bivalves of Europe
Bivalves described in 1835